Teacher Plus is an Indian magazine for schoolteachers.

Teacher Plus is published monthly with a distributed team of writers, editors and photographers across India.  It has a readership of approximately 25,000. Teacher Plus includes a pullout sheet of activities or a poster in every issue. The articles include both academic and practical perspectives on topics such as classroom management, teaching methods, and extra-curricular activities.  The magazine also reviews educational websites.

History
Teacher Plus first started as a bi-monthly in Hyderabad in 1989,1989 by Orient Longman. The magazine then adopted a tabloid format in 2002. Later in 2007, Spark-India bought Teacher Plus and converted it into a monthly magazine with a new design and cover. Finally, in 2010 Dr. Usha Raman, who is a communications professional, became the editor of Teacher Plus after taking it over from Spark-India. Wipro Applying Thought in Schools (WATIS) began funding Teacher Plus in development, production and distribution costs since 2006.

References

External links
 Teacher Plus website

1989 establishments in Andhra Pradesh
Education magazines
English-language magazines published in India
Monthly magazines published in India
Magazines established in 1989
Mass media in Hyderabad, India
Bi-monthly magazines published in India